Flute Suite is an album by American jazz composer and arranger A. K. Salim featuring flautists Frank Wess and Herbie Mann recorded in 1957 for the Savoy label.

Reception

Allmusic awarded the album 3 stars

Track listing
All compositions by A. K. Salim, except where noted.
 "Duo-Flautist" - 2:45	
 "Miltown Blues" - 7:20 	
 "Woolafunt's Lament" (Frank Wess) - 7:05 Bonus track on original LP release
 "Ballin' the Blues" - 3:23 	
 "Pretty Baby" - 4:57 	
 "Loping" - 2:51 	
 "Talk That Talk" - 4:11

Personnel 
A. K. Salim - arranger, director
Herbie Mann, Frank Wess - flute, tenor saxophone
Joe Wilder - trumpet
Frank Rehak - trombone
Hank Jones - piano
Wendell Marshall - bass
Bobby Donaldson - drums

Track 3 was an advance selection added on to the original LP release to promote the forthcoming album Jazz for Playboys and featured the following personnel:
Frank Wess - tenor saxophone
Kenny Burrell, Freddie Green - guitar
Eddie Jones - bass
Gus Johnson - drums 
Recorded at Van Gelder Studio in Hackensack, New Jersey on January 5, 1957

References 

1957 albums
A. K. Salim albums
Herbie Mann albums
Frank Wess albums
Savoy Records albums
Albums produced by Ozzie Cadena
Albums recorded at Van Gelder Studio